Luis Jiménez (born 4 June 1924) is a Mexican former sports shooter. He competed in the 25 metre pistol event at the 1960 Summer Olympics.

References

External links
 

1924 births
Possibly living people
Mexican male sport shooters
Olympic shooters of Mexico
Shooters at the 1960 Summer Olympics
Pan American Games bronze medalists for Mexico
Pan American Games medalists in shooting
Sportspeople from Guadalajara, Jalisco
Shooters at the 1955 Pan American Games
20th-century Mexican people